Railway test tracks include:

Tracks by country

China 
 China Railways test and certification center

Czech Republic 
 Velim railway test circuit

France 

 Centre d'essais ferroviaires – Near Alstom Valenciennes factory site in Raismes, includes 2.75 km for testing at 100 km/h, a 1.85 km loop for endurance testing at 80 km/h, and a loop for testing driverless trains.

Germany 

 Wegberg-Wildenrath Test and Validation Centre – Near Wildenrath in North Rhine-Westphalia. Several loops of standard gauge and metre gauge track with various electrification systems.

Italy 
 Bologna San Donato railway test circuit

Japan 

 Yamanashi test track –  Maglev technology development for the future Chuo Shinkansen line.
  – Tōkaidō Shinkansen test track, since 1962 to 1964. From Ayase, Kanagawa to near Kamonomiya Station (Odawara, Kanagawa). About 30 km long. It was incorporated into the main line.
 MIHARA Test Center – A railway test centre used by Mitsubishi Heavy Industries to test rolling stock for conventional rail (including light rail transit), automated guideway transit (especially the Mitsubishi Crystal Mover) and maglev High Speed Surface Transport.

Poland 

 Newag – manufacturer's onsite test track.
 Test Track Centre near Żmigród – Operated by Railway Institute, Warsaw. 7.7 km standard gauge loop, 160 km/h maximum allowed speed.

Romania 
 Railway Testing Center Faurei – Total length of lines: 20,2 km, maximum speed 200 km/h.

Russia 

 Moscow Monorail – 2.8 km operational, experimental monorail line.
 :ru:Экспериментальная кольцевая железная дорога ВНИИЖТ – VNIIZhT test range, a  circular test track in Shcherbinka, south of Moscow.

Singapore 
 Integrated Train Testing Centre – future integrated testing facility for all new and existing MRT lines due to open in stages from end-2022 to 2024.

Spain 
 Olmedo -‎ Medina del Campo test track 14.4km in length

The test track is built on the site of a closed broad gauge line.

United Kingdom 
 Global Centre of Rail Excellence
 Old Dalby Test Track
 High Marnham Test Track

United States 
 Maglev – AMT Test Track, Powder Springs, Georgia
 Transportation Technology Center – Four test tracks, total length , max speed (one of the tracks) , Pueblo, Colorado

References 

Test tracks